The Dean of Tuam is a post held in the Diocese of Tuam, as head of the cathedral chapter from after the creation of the diocese at the Synod of Rathbreasail in 1111.

Background

A dean is often the chief resident cleric of a cathedral or other collegiate church and the head of the chapter of canons. Some cathedral chapters are headed by Archpriests, Provosts or ( as in the mediaeval chapters of St David's and Llandaff until later reforms) a Precentor. 
If the cathedral or collegiate church has its own parish, the dean is now generally also rector of the parish. In the Church of Ireland dioceses of Clogher, Connor, and Dromore the roles are, however, often separated.

Since the Henrician Reformation, there have been parallel successions, one Church of Ireland, the other Roman Catholic.

List of deans (Pre-Reformation) 

 1230 - Máel Muire Ó Lachtáin. Became archbishop in 1236. "He undertook a pilgrimage to Jerusalem, and committed an account of his travels to writing. He died at Athlone, shortly before Christmas, in the year 1249."
 1282 - Constantine O'Dowd.
 133? - Philip Hanlain, died 19 June 1339.
 1339 - Denis Mac Áeda, son of Aedh Mac Áeda, succeeded. Possibly kinsman of Máel Sechlain Mac Áeda.
 1394 - James.
 1399 - James Caer, Carr, possibly the same person
 1523 - Thomas.

List of deans (Church of Ireland) 

The Dean of Tuam is based at the Cathedral Church of St Mary in Tuam in the Diocese of Tuam within the united bishopric of Tuam, Killala and Achonry of the Church of Ireland.

 1558–1573 - William O'Mullally (afterwards Archbishop of Tuam 1573)
 1573 - Edward Browne
 ?1604–1605 - Richard Boyle
 1609–1610 - Abel Walsh
 1625–?1637 - Thomas Peyton
 1638? - John King
 1661 - William Buchanan
 1669–1686 - James Wilson
 1686–1712 - Robert Echlin (murdered 1712)
 1712 - John Hinton and/or Thomas Butler.
 1716 - William White? (also Dean of Kilfenora 1716)
 1724 - Jonathan Bruce? (also Dean of Kilfenora 1724)
 1732 - 1740 Edmund Bray
 ?–1743 __ Hinton
 1743–1756 - Isaac Gervais
 1756–1759 - Robert Johnson (afterwards Bishop of Cloyne 1759)
 1759–1775 - Daniel le Tablere
 1775–1782 - Robert Clarke
 1782–1807 - Joshua Berkeley
 1807–1808 - James Mahon (afterwards Dean of Dromore 1808)
 1809–1810 - John William Keatinge (afterwards Dean of St Patrick's Cathedral 1810) 
 1810–1813 - Richard Bourne (afterwards Chancellor of Armagh, 1813)
 1813–1849 - Thomas Carter
 1850–1867 - Hon Robert Plunket
 1867–1878 - Charles Henry Seymour
 1879–1898 - William Chambers Townsend
 1898–1904 - Andrew C. Tait
 1904–1917 - John Geddes
 1917–1923 - John Orr (afterwards Bishop of Tuam, Killala and Achonry 1923)
 1945–1965 - Joseph Jackson
 1966–1981 - Walter Cyril Spence 
 1981–1993 - William James Grant 
 1993–1996 - Anthony Previté 
 1997–1999 - Ian Deighton Corbett 
 2000–2022 - Alistair John Grimason

See also

The Chapter of St Mary's Cathedral, Tuam consists, in addition to the Dean: a Provost, Lynda Peilow (since 2020); an Archdeacon, Gary Hastings (since 2007), and the Prebendaries of Balla, held by the Provost (since 2010); of Faldown & Kilmainmore, held by the Archdeacon; of Kilmeen & Kilmoylan, Doris Clements (since 2011); of Taghsaxon & Laccagh, Maureen Ryan (2005); and of Killybegs, which is vacant.

 Archdeacon of Tuam

Sources
 Fasti ecclesiæ hibernicæ: the succession of the prelates and members of the Cathedral bodies in Ireland - Volume 4 |accessdate= 2012-01-08

External links
 https://archive.org/stream/fastiecclesiaehi04cottuoft#page/n33/mode/2up

Tuam
 
Diocese of Tuam, Killala and Achonry